This is a list of ballets by George Balanchine (1904–1983), New York City Ballet co-founder and ballet master.

Chronological  
  
1928 Apollo
1929 Le Bal
1929 The Prodigal Son
1935 Serenade
1936 Slaughter on Tenth Avenue
1936 Zenobia
1937 Jeu de cartes
1941 Concerto Barocco
1941 Tschaikovsky Piano Concerto No. 2
1942 Circus Polka
1946 La Sonnambula
1946 The Four Temperaments
1947 Haieff Divertimento
1947 Symphonie Concertante
1947 Symphony in C
1947 Theme and Variations
1948 Orpheus
1948 Pas de Trois (Minkus)
1949 Bourrée fantasque
1949 The Firebird
1950 Sylvia Pas de Deux
1951 À la Françaix1951 La Valse1951 Swan Lake (Act 2)
1952 Bayou1952 Concertino1952 Harlequinade Pas de Deux1952 Metamorphoses1952 Scotch Symphony1954 Ivesiana1954 The Nutcracker1954 Western Symphony1955 Pas de Dix1955 Pas de Trois1956 Allegro Brillante1956 Divertimento No. 151957 Agon1957 Square Dance1958 Gounod Symphony1958 Stars and Stripes1959 Episodes1960 Donizetti Variations1960 Liebeslieder Walzer1960 Monumentum pro Gesualdo1960 Ragtime (I)1960 Tschaikovsky Pas de Deux1961 Raymonda Variations1962 A Midsummer Night's Dream1963 Bugaku1963 Meditation 
1963 Movements for Piano and Orchestra1964 Clarinade1964 Tarantella1965 Don Quixote1965 Harlequinade1966 Brahms–Schoenberg Quartet1966 Variations1967 Divertimento Brillante1967 Jewels Emeralds Rubies Diamonds1967 Ragtime (II)1967 Valse-Fantaisie1968 Metastaseis and Pithoprakta1968 Requiem Canticles1968 La Source1968 Slaughter on Tenth Avenue1970 Tschaikovsky Suite No. 31970 Who Cares?1972 Divertimento from Le baiser de la fée
1972 Duo Concertant
1972 Pulcinella
1972 Scherzo à la Russe
1972 Stravinsky Violin Concerto
1972 Symphony in Three Movements
1973 Cortège Hongrois
1974 Coppélia
1974 Variations pour une porte et un soupir
1975 Le tombeau de Couperin
1975 Pavane
1975 Sonatine
1975 The Steadfast Tin Soldier
1975 Tzigane
1976 Chaconne
1976 Union Jack
1977 Etude for Piano
1977 Vienna Waltzes
1978 Ballo della Regina
1978 Kammermusik No. 2
1979 Le Bourgeois Gentilhomme
1980 Ballade
1980 Robert Schumann’s Davidsbündlertänze
1980 Walpurgisnacht Ballet
1981 Garland Dance
1981 Hungarian Gypsy Airs
1981 Mozartiana
1982 Élégie
1982 Noah and the Flood
1982 Tango
1982 Variations for Orchestra

Alphabetical  
  
1951 À la Françaix
1962 A Midsummer Night's Dream
1957 Agon
1956 Allegro Brillante
1928 Apollo
1929 Le Bal
1980 Ballade
1978 Ballo della Regina
1952 Bayou
1979 Le Bourgeois Gentilhomme
1949 Bourrée fantasque
1966 Brahms–Schoenberg Quartet
1963 Bugaku
1976 Chaconne
1942 Circus Polka 
1964 Clarinade
1952 Concertino
1941 Concerto Barocco
1974 Coppélia
1973 Cortège Hongrois
1967 Diamonds
1967 Divertimento Brillante
1972 Divertimento from Le baiser de la fée
1956 Divertimento No. 15
1965 Don Quixote
1960 Donizetti Variations
1972 Duo Concertant
1982 Élégie
1967 Emeralds
1959 Episodes
1977 Etude for Piano
1949 The Firebird
1946 The Four Temperaments
1981 Garland Dance
1958 Gounod Symphony
1947 Haieff Divertimento
1965 Harlequinade
1952 Harlequinade Pas de Deux
1981 Hungarian Gypsy Airs
1954 Ivesiana
1937 Jeu de cartes
1967 Jewels
1978 Kammermusik No. 2
1946 La Sonnambula
1968 La Source
1951 La Valse
1929 Le Bal
1960 Liebeslieder Walzer
1963 Meditation
1952 Metamorphoses
1968 Metastaseis and Pithoprakta

1960 Monumentum pro Gesualdo
1963 Movements for Piano and Orchestra
1981 Mozartiana
1982 Noah and the Flood
1948 Orpheus
1955 Pas de Dix
1955 Pas de Trois (Glinka)
1948 Pas de Trois (Minkus]
1975 Pavane
1929 The Prodigal Son
1972 Pulcinella
1960 Ragtime (I)
1967 Ragtime (II)
1961 Raymonda Variations
1968 Requiem Canticles
1980 Robert Schumann’s Davidsbündlertänze
1967 Rubies
1972 Scherzo à la russe
1952 Scotch Symphony
1935 Serenade
1936 Slaughter on Tenth Avenue
1975 Sonatine
1968 La source
1957 Square Dance
1958 Stars and Stripes
1975 The Steadfast Tin Soldier
1972 Stravinsky Violin Concerto
1951 Swan Lake (Act 2)
1950 Sylvia Pas de Deux
1947 Symphonie Concertante
1947 Symphony in C
1972 Symphony in Three Movements
1982 Tango
1964 Tarantella
1947 Theme and Variations
1975 Le tombeau de Couperin
1960 Tschaikovsky Pas de Deux
1941 Tschaikovsky Piano Concerto No. 2
1970 Tschaikovsky Suite No. 3
1975 Tzigane
1976 Union Jack
1967 Valse-Fantaisie
1966 Variations
1982 Variations for Orchestra
1974 Variations pour une porte et un soupir
1977 Vienna Waltzes
1980 Walpurgisnacht Ballet
1954 Western Symphony
1970 Who Cares?
1936 Zenobia

By company

For Ballets Russes
 Le Chant du rossignol (The Song of the Nightingale) (1925)
 Jack in the Box (1926)
 Pastorale (1926)
 Barabau (1926)
 La Chatte (1927)
 Le Triomphe de Neptune (1927)
 Apollo (1928)
 The Prodigal Son (1929)
 Le Bal (1929)

For Ballet Russe de Monte-Carlo
 Cotillon (1932)
 Concurrence (1932)
 Le Bourgeois Gentilhomme (1932 and 1944)
 Balustrade (1941)
 Danses concertantes (1944 and 1972)
 Song of Norway (1944)
 Pas de Deux (Grand adagio)  (1945)
 La Sonnambula (1946)
 The Night Shadow (1946)
 Raymonda (1946)

For Les Ballets 1933
 The Seven Deadly Sins (1933)
 Errante (1933)
 Les Songes (1933)
 Fastes (1933)

For the American Ballet
 Alma Mater (1934)
 Les Songes (Dreams) (1934)
 Mozartiana (1934)
 Serenade (1935)
 Errante (1935)
 Reminiscence (1935)
 Jeu de cartes (variously, Card Game or The Card Party) (1937)
 Le Baiser de la Fée (originally titled The Fairy's Kiss) (1937)

For Broadway

Ziegfeld Follies of 1936
 Words without Music: A Surrealist Ballet, a production number for the singing and dancing ensemble
 Night Flight, a solo for Harriet Hoctor
 5 A.M., a number for Josephine Baker and male dancers
On Your Toes (1936), music by Richard Rodgers, lyrics by Lorenz Hart; starring Tamara Geva and Ray Bolger
 Princess Zenobia Ballet (1936)
 Slaughter on Tenth Avenue (1936)
This dramatic ballet served as the climax of this musical production and has subsequently been presented as a stand-alone piece; however, several of the sung numbers in the show featured dance routines as well, notably the title number.
 Babes in Arms (1937), by Rodgers and Hart
 I Married an Angel (1938), by Rodgers and Hart; starring Vera Zorina
 The Boys from Syracuse (1938), by Rodgers and Hart
 Great Lady (1938), music by Frederick Loewe
 Keep Off the Grass (1940), a musical revue
 Louisiana Purchase (1940), music and lyrics by Irving Berlin; with William Gaxton and Vera Zorina
 Cabin in the Sky (1940), music by Vernon Duke, lyrics by John Latouche; starring Ethel Waters and Katherine Dunham, who collaborated with Balanchine on the choreography
 The Lady Comes Across (1942), by Duke and Latouche; a notable flop
 Rosalinda (1942), an operetta with music by Johann Strauss
 The Merry Widow (1943), an operetta with music by Franz Lehár
 What's Up? (1943), lyrics by Alan Jay Lerner, music by Frederick Loewe
 Dream with Music (1944), a musical fantasy starring Vera Zorina
 Song of Norway (1944), an operetta based on the life and music of Edvard Grieg; Balanchine's most successful Broadway show
 Mr. Strauss Goes to Boston (1945), another flop
 The Chocolate Soldier (1947), an operetta with music by Oscar Straus
 Where's Charley? lyrics and music by Frank Loesser, a long-running show starring Ray Bolger
 Courtin' Time (1951), music and lyrics by Don Walker and Jack Lawrence
 House of Flowers (1954), music by Harold Arlen, lyrics by Truman Capote and Harold Arlen; starring Pearl Bailey, Diahann Carroll, and Juanita Hall; Balanchine's choreography was rearranged by Herbert Ross before the Broadway opening

For Hollywood
 The Goldwyn Follies (1938), with Vera Zorina and William Dollar as principal dancers
 "Romeo and Juliet," with ballet dancers as the Capulets and tap dancers as the Montagues
 "Water Nymph Ballet," in which Zorina rose from the depths of a pool
 On Your Toes (1939), the film version of the Broadway show, starring Vera Zorina and Eddie Albert
 I Was an Adventuress (1940), starring Vera Zorina
 Star Spangled Rhythm (1942), a wartime morale booster for military troops
 "That Old Black Magic," sung by Johnny Johnston, danced by Vera Zorina
 Follow the Boys (1944), with Vera Zorina and George Raft

For American Ballet Caravan 
 Ballet Imperial (1941; renamed Tschaikovsky Piano Concerto No. 2 in 1973)
 Concerto Barocco (1941)

For the Ballet del Teatro de Colón 
 Mozart Violin Concerto (1942)

For Ballet Theatre 
 Waltz Academy (1944)
 Theme and Variations (1947)

For Ballet Society 
 The Four Temperaments (1946)
 L'enfant et Les Sortilèges (The Spellbound Child) (1946)
 Haieff Divertimento (1947)
 Symphonie Concertante (1947)
 Orpheus (1948)

For the Paris Opera Ballet 
 Palais de Cristal (renamed Symphony in C) (1947)

For Le Grand Ballet du Marquis de Cuevas 
 Pas de Trois Classique (also known as Minkus Pas de Trois) (1948)

For New York City Ballet 

 La Sonnambula (1946)
 Bourrée Fantasque (1949)
 The Firebird (1959; later revised with Jerome Robbins)
 Sylvia Pas De Deux (1950)
 Swan Lake (after Lev Ivanov) (1951)
 La Valse (1951)
 Harlequinade Pas De Deux (1952)
 Metamorphoses (1952)
 Scotch Symphony (1952)
 Valse Fantaisie (1953/1967)
 The Nutcracker (1954)
 Ivesiana (1954)
 Western Symphony (1954)
 Glinka Pas De Trois (1955)
 Pas De Dix (1955)
 Divertimento No. 15 (1956)
 Allegro Brillante (1956)
 Agon (1957)
 Square Dance (1957)
 Gounod Symphony (1958)
 Stars and Stripes (a ballet in five "campaigns") (1958)
 Episodes (1959)
 Tschaikovsky Pas de Deux (1960)
 Monumentum pro Gesualdo (1960)
 Donizetti Variations (1960)
 Liebeslieder Walzer (1960)
 Raymonda Variations (1961)
 A Midsummer Night's Dream (1962)
 Bugaku (1963)
 Meditation (1963)
 Movements for Piano and Orchestra (1963)
 Harlequinade (1965)
 Brahms–Schoenberg Quartet (1966)
 Jewels (1967)
 Emeralds Rubies Diamonds La Source (1968)
 Who Cares? (1970)
 Tschaikovsky Suite No. 3 (1970)
 Stravinsky Festival (1972)
 Pulcinella (with Jerome Robbins)
 Stravinsky Violin Concerto Symphony in Three Movements Duo Concertant Lost Sonata Divertimento from "Le Baiser de la fée" Choral Variations on Bach's "Vom Himmel Hoch" Danses Concertantes Scherzo Á La Russe Cortège Hongrois (1973)
 Coppélia (1974)
 Variations pour une porte et un soupir (1974)
 Ravel Festival (1975)
 Sonatine Tzigane Le tombeau de Couperin Pavane Shéhérazade Gaspard de la Nuit Rapsodie Espagnole The Steadfast Tin Soldier (1975)
 Chaconne (1976)
 Union Jack (1976)
 Vienna Waltzes (1977)
 Ballo della Regina (1978)
 Kammermusik No. 2 (1978)
 Robert Schumann's Davidsbündlertänze (1980)
 Walpurgisnacht Ballet (1980)
 Tschaikovsky Festival (1981)
 Garland Dance from The Sleeping Beauty Mozartiana Stravinsky Centennial Celebration (1982)
 ÉlégieFor New York City Opera
 Le Bourgeois Gentilhomme (1979)

Notes

NYC Ballet Premiere
May 15, 1975, New York State Theater, Ravel Festival, as L'Enfant et les Sortilèges''. https://www.nycballet.com/ballets/s/the-spellbound-child.aspx

External links 
List of ballets on the website of the Balanchine Trust

 
Balanchine, George